Antonio Mesina (born 11 January 1993) is an Italian footballer who plays as a forward for Casale in Serie D.

Career
Mesina spent the majority of his early career being loaned about Sardinia, finally settling at Castiadas in 2017. In his first season with the club, Mesina scored 23 league goals, which led to him being crowned the top scorer of the Eccellenza, Italy's fifth tier.

In July 2019, Masina moved to Serie C club Arezzo. He made his league debut for the club on 25 August 2019, coming on as an 85th minute substitute for Aniello Cutolo in a 3–1 home victory over Lecco.

On 8 October 2020 he moved to Torres in Serie D.

References

External links

1993 births
Living people
Italian footballers
Association football forwards
S.S. Arezzo players
S.E.F. Torres 1903 players
U.S.D. Sestri Levante 1919 players
Casale F.B.C. players
Serie C players
Serie D players